Bernardo Jesús Araya Ponce (born 5 June 1993) is a Chilean futsal player who plays as a defender. Besides Chile, he has played in Argentine, France and Brazil.

Career
As a youth footballer, Araya was with both Colo-Colo and Universidad de Chile at under-17 and under-18 level, respectively. Next he spent a season with Deportes Tocopilla.

In 2013 he switched to futsal after a trial to join Chile national futsal team alongside his best friend. Having played for both Palestino and Deportes Concepción in his homeland, in 2018 he moved to Argentine side Newell's Old Boys.

As a member of Newell's Old Boys, he got three consecutive promotions and played at all categories of the Argentine futsal.

In 2021, he moved to French side , becoming the first Chilean to play in Europe.

Due to a serious knee injury, he returned to Argentina in 2022 and joined San Lorenzo, winnign the league title and the Copa Argentina.

In 2023, he joined Brazilian club Sercesa in the Liga Gaúcha, becoming the first Chilean to play in the Brazilian futsal.

International career
Araya has taken part of the Chile national futsal team since under-23 level, becoming the team captain at senior level.

Personal life
Araya is the younger brother of Karen Araya, a Chilean professional footballer.

References

External links
 Bernardo Araya at PlaymakerStats.com

1993 births
Living people
Footballers from Santiago
Chilean footballers
Chilean men's futsal players

Chilean expatriate sportspeople in Argentina
Chilean expatriate sportspeople in France
Chilean expatriate sportspeople in Brazil
Futsal defenders